The Type 053H2G (NATO codename Jiangwei I) were Chinese frigates that entered service with the People's Liberation Army Navy Surface Force in the 1990s. They were later variants of the Type 053 frigate family, and were the PLAN's first multi-role frigates. Only four units were built before the class was superseded by the more capable Type 053H3 (Jiangwei II) class

Three vessels are currently serving as coast guard cutters and the frigate Tongling was transferred to the Sri Lanka Navy in 2019 as a patrol vessel, which was commissioned as SLNS Parakramabahu.

History
In the 1980s, the PLAN ordered Shanghai-based Hudong Shipyard (now Hudong-Zhonghua Shipyard) to build a replacement for the Type 053K air defence frigate. The new class was based on the Type 053H2 frigate and designated Type 053H2G. Development was carried out under Project 055.

The Type 053H2G was slightly larger than the Type 053H2, and equipped with HQ-61B surface-to-air missiles (SAM). Four Type 053H2G were built between 1988 and 1991. Some sources claim they were called Type 055 and uprated with HQ-7 SAMs; the alternate designation may have been confused with the Type 053H2G's development designation.

The HQ-61 SAM proved unsatisfactory and the class was superseded by the Type 053H3 which was an improved Type 053H2G equipped with HQ-7 SAMs.

Ships of Class

References

External links
 Sino Defense Today

 
Frigate classes